Yuliya Siarheyevna Leantsiuk (born 31 January 1984 in Pinsk) is a Belarusian track and field athlete who competes in the shot put. She represented her country at the 2013 World Championships in Athletics and the 2014 IAAF World Indoor Championships.

She was a silver medallist at the Summer Universiade and Military World Games in 2007, and a bronze medallist at the 2001 World Youth Championships in Athletics. She was banned for doping in 2008.

Career

Early career
Leantsiuk made her international debut in 2001 at the age of seventeen. Competing at the 2001 World Youth Championships in Athletics, she was the bronze medallist behind Valerie Adams and Michelle Carter. Shortly afterwards she won a gold medal at the 2001 European Youth Olympic Festival, beating Mama Fatty.

She was runner-up to Russian rival Anna Avdeyeva at the 2003 European Athletics Junior Championships. She was also second in the First League meeting of the 2006 European Cup.

Senior medals and doping ban
In good form, she won the Belarusian indoor title and represented her country at the 2007 European Athletics Indoor Championships, where she was fourth. A fourth-place finish at the 2007 European Cup Winter Throwing followed later that month. She threw the implement  in Minsk that June and went on to claim silver medals at both the Summer Universiade and the Military World Games. At the start of 2008 she was fourth at the European Indoor Cup and fifth at the European Winter Throwing Cup. A significant personal best of  came at the end of May but her performance at the 2008 European Cup was erased as she failed a doping test for excess testosterone and was banned from competition until July 2010.

Return to shot put
She did not return immediately after her ban and finally returned to track and field at the beginning of 2013. She represented Belarus in the shot put at the 2013 World Championships in Athletics, but did not progress beyond the qualifying round. She did not throw as far in the final, however, and finished seventh.

References

External links

1984 births
Living people
Belarusian female shot putters
Doping cases in athletics
Belarusian sportspeople in doping cases
World Athletics Championships athletes for Belarus
Athletes (track and field) at the 2016 Summer Olympics
Olympic athletes of Belarus
Universiade medalists in athletics (track and field)
Universiade silver medalists for Belarus
Medalists at the 2007 Summer Universiade
Sportspeople from Pinsk